Sýkora (feminine: Sýkorová) is a surname of Czech and Slovak language origin. It is related to the Polish surname Sikora. All are derived from a Slavic word for birds of the Paridae (tit) family which was used as a nickname for a small, agile person.

Notable people with the surname include:

 Adéla Sýkorová, Czech sport shooter
 Fiete Sykora (born 1982), German footballer
 Ján Sýkora (born 1990), Slovak ice hockey player
 Jan Sýkora (born 1993), Czech footballer
 Jana Sýkorová (born 1973), Czech opera singer
 Ken Sykora (1923–2006), British jazz guitarist
 Marie Sýkorová (born 1951), Czech field hockey player
 Michal Sýkora (born 1973), Czech ice hockey player
 Peter Sykora (born 1946), German footballer
 Petr Sýkora (born 1976), Czech ice hockey player
 Petr Sýkora (born 1978), Czech ice hockey player
 Stacy Sykora (born 1977), American volleyball player
 Thomas Sykora (born 1968), Austrian alpine skier
 Tibor Sýkora, Czech slalom canoeist
 Tom Sykora (born 1946), American politician
 Zdeněk Sýkora (1920–2011), Czech artist

See also
 
Sikorski (disambiguation)

References

Czech-language surnames
Slovak-language surnames